Mojo Hand is an album by the blues musician Lightnin' Hopkins, recorded in 1960 and released on the Fire label in 1962.

Reception

AllMusic reviewer Tim Sheridan stated: "This album, recorded for Fire Records, is especially interesting because it casts Hopkins in a more R&B-flavored environment. This obvious effort to get a hit makes for some excellent blues; moody and powerful performances play throughout. There's even a charming novelty Christmas blues". The Penguin Guide to Blues Recordings wrote that "Lightnin' is focussed and businesslike and delivers a strong and varied sequence of songs; the bassist and drummer unobtrusive but very much there".

Track listing
All compositions credited to Sam "Lightnin'" Hopkins, M. Robinson and C. Lewis
 "Mojo Hand" – 2:55
 "Coffee for Mama" – 3:25
 "Awful Dreams" – 4:50
 "Black Mare Trot" – 3:55
 "Have You Ever Loved a Woman" – 2:38
 "Glory Be" – 4:25
 "Sometimes She Will" – 2:30
 "Shine On, Moon!" – 4:17
 "Santa" – 3:44

Personnel

Performance
Lightnin' Hopkins – guitar, vocals, piano
Unknown musician – bass
Delmar Donnell – drums

Production
 Bobby Robinson – producer

References

Lightnin' Hopkins albums
1962 albums
Fire Records albums